The Free Nations of Post-Russia Forum (FNRF or FSNR) is a foreign conference founded by Ilya Ponomarev and other opposition activists, regional and separatist movements in Russia, as well as Western sympathizers, which advocates for the disintegration of Russia.

According to its own statements, the forum aims to fight for the "decolonization, de-occupation, decentralization, de-Putinization, denazification and demilitarisation of Russia."

History

First forum 
The first Free Nations of Russia Forum was held on 8-9 May, 2022 in Warsaw, Poland. The event was organized by the Solidarity of Journalists Foundation. The forum was attended by former State Duma deputy Ilya Ponomarev, as well as representatives of several regionalist and separatist movements within Russia, such as those of Bashkortostan, Chechnya and Siberia. At the first forum, the Free Russia Forum, another gathering of Russian opposition, was openly criticised, with journalist Vadim Shtepa claiming that the latter was dominated by "centralist thinking." Also participating in the forum was Belarusian opposition politician Pavel Latushko, MEP and former Polish Foreign Minister Anna Fotyga, former Ukrainian Foreign Minister Pavlo Klimkin, and former U.S. Secretary of Defense Christopher Miller.

The forum participants called for, among other things, the dissolution of Russia and claimed that overt linguocide, ethnocide, and genocide were being committed by the government of Russia against non-Russians, both in Ukraine and Russia.

Second forum 
The second forum was held in Prague, Czech Republic on 22-24 July 2022. The forum was attended by Ponomarev, Klimkin, and former Chechen leader Akhmed Zakayev, among others. The forum adopted a declaration calling for Russia to be declared a terrorist state and decolonized. A map was published on the forum, where Russia is divided into 34 states, including an independent Chechnya and Siberia.

Third forum 
The third forum is expected in Gdańsk, Poland on 23-25 September 2022. Its focus will be "liberation from the Kremlin empire and return to native European penates" of the "old-new" states of the western region of present-day Russia.

Political positions 
The Free Nations of Russia Forum has been cast by its members as a federalist alternative to other opposition forums, such as the Free Russia Forum, and has promoted the dissolution of Russia into a federation or confederation. Members of the Forum have called for units consisting of Russian ethnic minorities within the Armed Forces of Ukraine while also expressing Ukraine's resistance to the 2022 Russian invasion of Ukraine as a model for minorities within Russia.

Criticism
Political scientist Alexander Kynev said that the "little-known [separatist or confederalist] participants of the Forum, who have little understanding of the mood inside the country, presented a gift to Russian propaganda, which already periodically repeats that the enemies of Russia want to split and destroy it." Vadim Shtepa, a leading Russian regionalist and one of the founders of the organization, withdrew from the Forum in December 2022, condemning it as a "parody" which, instead of performing serious analytical work on de-imperalization, focused on "loud" and "empty" declarations of independence by emigrants that would have no practical effect on their respective regions.

On the website of "SVTV", the publication of the politician Mikhail Svetov, there was a message about "state security agents who gathered ... a forum to remind you that if not Putin, then a civil war" and "painted a contour map without really thinking about the meaning of the proposed reforms".

On July 25, the head of Chechnya Ramzan Kadyrov ridiculed the Free Nations of Russia Forum, held in Prague. He thanked the "pseudo-liberals" for confirming the words of the Russian leadership about attempts to disintegrate the country.

The FNRF was also criticized for labelling the other Russian opposition groups (especially the Freedom of Russia Legion) as "imperialist".

Marlène Laruelle wrote that Western politicians should not confuse the radical statements of political exiles with the views of Russian citizens, including those of the FNRF with its call for the "liberation of captive nations", a phrase dating back to the imperial era and the CIA-backed Anti-Bolshevik Bloc of Nations; she also argued that advocating for a breakup of Russia is a false strategy that would be "catastrophic for international security" and stems from a lack of knowledge of what "holds Russian society together in all its diversity".

See also 
 Congress of the Enslaved Peoples of Russia
 Prometheism
 Anti-Bolshevik Bloc of Nations
 Dissolution of Russia

References

External links
Free Nations of Russia Forum
Telegram channel
Youtube channel  
Facebook page
Instagram page

2022 Russian invasion of Ukraine
Federalism in Russia
International conferences
Opposition to Vladimir Putin
Organizations established in 2022
Political organizations based in Russia
Political parties established in 2022
Separatism in Russia